Uno is the second studio album from the Sheffield rockers ThisGirl, and is the follow-up to 2002's ...Short Strut to the Brassy Front. Uno was released on July 12, 2004 by the artist management company Drowned In Sound.

Track listing
 "Master Blaster" - 3:34
 "Don't Be A Kite" - 4:38
 "Your Are But A Draft, A Long Rehearsal For A Show That Will Never Play" - 3:58
 "Hallelujah" - 2:37
 "Beeping At Pedestrians" - 3:15
 "Drake" - 4:45
 "Coffee And Giro Cheques" - 3:53
 "Oscilloscope Love" - 3:04
 "Inshallah" - 4:16
 "Dah Dah Dah Dah" - 3:13
 "Cartwheels" - 4:12
 "St.James Gate Marylebone" - 5:43

Singles

Reviews
MusicOMH, July 12, 2004 
Gigwise, July 12, 2004 
Vault, July 2004 
Sputnik Music, February 21, 2005

References

2004 albums
ThisGirl albums
Albums produced by Chris Tsangarides